Nadir Burjorji Godrej (born 1951) is an Indian chemical engineer, industrialist and member of the Godrej family. He is managing director of Godrej Industries, one of India's biggest businesses, and as chairman of Godrej Agrovet.

Background and personal life
Godrej was born the younger son of Burjorji Godrej by his wife Jaiben Godrej. Burjorji was the nephew of Ardeshir Godrej, founder of the Godrej group of industries. Since Ardeshir was childless, the vast industrial estate created by Ardeshir was inherited by three nephews. The family belongs to the Parsi community and follows the (Zoroastrian) religion. The Godrej family has been settled in Mumbai for over two centuries. After studying in IIT Bombay for 1 year Nadir Godrej transferred to MIT and earned his Bachelor of Science in Chemical Engineering and a Master of Science in Engineering  from Stanford University. Then he earned his Masters in Business Administration from Harvard Business School.

Nadir Godrej has one older brother, Adi Godrej, who is the chairman of the Godrej Group. He is a first cousin of Jamshyd Godrej, chairman and managing director of Godrej & Boyce, another major family firm.

Nadir Godrej is married to Dr. Rati Godrej. The couple have three sons, Burjis (b. 1992), Sohrab (b. 1994) and Hormusji (b. 1996). They live in Mumbai.

Career
Godrej currently serves as managing director of Godrej Industries, one of India's biggest businesses, and as chairman of Godrej Agrovet. These are two of the major companies run by his family.

Apart from holding positions of responsibility in his own family's companies, Godrej also sits as an independent director on the boards of several non-group companies. As of 2016, these include Mahindra & Mahindra, Tata Teleservices, and Taj Hotels.

He is also on the board of advisors of India's International Movement to Unite Nations (I.I.M.U.N.).

In 2013 he made an undisclosed angel investment in an Indian social networking service, LocalCircles.

Awards
Exemplary industrialist award.

Interests
Godrej speaks six languages, including Russian and French. He is known for his fondness of poetry and mathematics. He is also a published poet. Godrej is also a part of the advisory board of IIMUN.

References 

Businesspeople from Mumbai
Parsi people from Mumbai
Massachusetts Institute of Technology alumni
Harvard Business School alumni
Godrej Group
Stanford University alumni
1951 births
Living people
Godrej family